Neal is an unincorporated community in eastern Greenwood County, Kansas, United States.  As of the 2020 census, the population of the community and nearby areas was 37.  It is located approximately 10 miles east of the city of Eureka along U.S. Route 54 highway.

History
The first post office in Neal was established in 1882.  Although Neal is unincorporated, it has a post office, with the ZIP code of 66863. 

Neal was named for a minor official of the Missouri Pacific Railroad.

Geography
Its elevation is 961 feet (293 m), and it is located at  (37.8341990, -96.0802724).

Demographics

For statistical purposes, the United States Census Bureau has defined this community as a census-designated place (CDP).

Education
The community is served by Eureka USD 389 public school district.

References

Further reading

External links
 Greenwood County maps: Current, Historic, KDOT

Unincorporated communities in Greenwood County, Kansas
Unincorporated communities in Kansas